17 Comae Berenices (17 Com) is a multiple star system in the northern constellation of Coma Berenices. The brighter component, 17 Com A, is a naked eye star with an apparent visual magnitude of 5.2. It has a faint companion of magnitude 6.6, 17 Com B, positioned at an angular separation of  along a position angle of 251°, as of 2018. They are located at a distance of approximately 240 light years from the Sun based on parallax measurements.

The double nature of this system was documented by F. G. W. Struve in 1836. The pair share a common proper motion through space and thus may be associated. Component B is itself a binary star system, although only the brighter component is visible in the spectrum.

The star 17 Com A was classified as chemically peculiar by A. J. Cannon prior to 1918. W. W. Morgan in 1932 found the star's spectral lines varied in strength and appearance, and detected lines of the element europium. H. W. Babcock and T. G. Cowling measured the Zeeman effect in this star, demonstrating in 1953 that it has a magnetic field. In 1967, E. P. J. van den Heuvel noted the blue excess of this star, suggesting it is a blue straggler. G. W. Preston and associates in 1969 found that the luminosity and magnetic field of this star varied in strength with a time scale of around five days.

17 Com A is a magnetic chemically peculiar Ap star with a stellar classification of A0p or A0 SrCrEu, with the latter indicating the spectrum shows abundance anomalies of the elements strontium, chromium, and europium. The level of silicon in the atmosphere is also enhanced and it shows a significant helium deficiency. It has the variable star designation of AI Com, and is classified as an Alpha2 Canum Venaticorum variable and a suspected Delta Scuti variable. It has been identified as a suspected blue straggler.

The primary has an estimated age of 101 million years and is spinning with a projected rotational velocity of 20 km/s. It has more than double the mass and twice the radius of the Sun. It is radiating 43 times the luminosity of the Sun from its photosphere at an effective temperature of around 10,000 K.

The co-moving companion, component B, is a single-lined spectroscopic binary with an orbital period of 68.3 days and an eccentricity (ovalness) of 0.3. The visible member of this binary pair is a strong Am star with a class of kA2hA9VmF0, indicating it has the Calcium K-lines of an A0 star, the hydrogen lines of an A9 star, and the metallic lines of an F0 star.

References

External links

A-type main-sequence stars
Ap stars
Am stars
Alpha2 Canum Venaticorum variables
Delta Scuti variables
Spectroscopic binaries
Triple stars

Coma Berenices
4752
+26 2353
Com, 17
108662
060904
Comae Berenices, AI